The Washington Sailing Marina is located in Daingerfield Island, Alexandria, Virginia (United States), on the Potomac River. It hosts the Potomac River Sailing Association, Daingerfield Island Sailing Fleet, Sailing Club of Washington, Georgetown University Sailing Team and George Washington University Sailing Team.

References

External links
Official website

College sailing venues in the United States
Sailing in Washington, D.C.
Marinas in the United States